Gladstone station may refer to:

Gladstone Power Station, in Gladstone, Queensland, Australia
Gladstone station (NJ Transit), in Peapack-Gladstone, New Jersey, USA
Gladstone station (SEPTA), in Lansdowne, Pennsylvania, USA
Gladstone station (Manitoba), in Gladstone, Manitoba, Canada
Gladstone station (Ottawa), in Ottawa, Ontario, Canada
Gladstone railway station, Queensland, in Gladstone, Queensland, Australia
Gladstone railway station, South Australia, Gladstone, South Australia, Australia

See also
Gladstone Park station
Gladstone (disambiguation)